Alina Begum is a Bangladeshi badminton player.

Career 
Alina Begum won her first two national titles in Bangladesh in 1990. 14 further titles won until 2001. She was champion nine times in the women's single, six times in the doubles and once in the mixed. She received 2001 Sports Awards by the Bangladesh Sports Writers Association.

References 

Year of birth missing (living people)
Living people
Bangladeshi female badminton players